Stanley is a toponymic surname, a contraction of Stan (a form of "stone") and Leigh (meadow), later also being used as a masculine given name.

People with the given name
 Ann Dunham birth name Stanley Ann Dunham, mother of the 44th president Barack Obama
 Stanley (Brazilian footballer) (Stanley Richieri Afonso, born 1985), Brazil
 Stanley Adams (actor) (1915–1977), American actor and screenwriter
 Stanley Adams (singer) (1907–1994), American singer and lyricist
 Stanley Adams (whistleblower) (born 1927), Maltese whistleblower in the pharmaceutical industry
 Stanley T. Adams (1922–1999), American Army officer, recipient of the Medal of Honor during the Korean War
 Stanley Amis (1924–2021), British architect
 Stanley Andrisse, American endocrinologist
 Stan Arthur (born 1935), U.S. Navy officer; Vice Chief of Naval Operations 1992–95
 Stanley Baker (1928–1976), Welsh actor and producer
 Stanley Baldwin (1867–1947), three-time prime minister of the United Kingdom
 Stanley Baxter (born 1926), Scottish actor, comedian, impressionist, and author
 Stanley Berryhill (born 1998), American football player
 Stanley Bleifeld (1924–2011), American sculptor
 Stanley Booth-Clibborn (1924–1996), British Anglican bishop
 Stanley Branche (1933–1992), American civil rights leader
 Stanley Brundy (born 1967), American basketball player
 Stanley Burrell, American rapper known as MC Hammer
 Stanley Cavell (1926–2018), American philosopher
 Stanley Chais (1926–2010), American investment advisor in the Madoff investment scandal
 Stanley Chera (1942–2020), American real estate developer
 Stanley R. Christianson (1925–1950), American Marine, awarded Medal of Honor
 Stanley Clarke (born 1951), American jazz and funk bassist
 Stanley Clements (1926–1981), American actor and comedian
 Stanley Cohen (biochemist) (1922–2020), American biochemist, Nobel Prize in Physiology or Medicine Laureate
 Stanley Cohen (physicist) (born 1927), American physicist, founder and president of Speakeasy Computing Corporation
 Stan Cohen (politician) (1927–2004), British Labour politician
 Stanley Cohen (sociologist) (1942–2013), Martin White Professor of Sociology at the London School of Economics
 Stanley G. Cohen, American music educator, president of Five Towns College
 Stanley Norman Cohen (born 1935), American geneticist
 Stanley Donen (1924–2019), American film director and choreographer
 Stan Drake (1921–1997), American cartoonist
 Stanley Ann Dunham (1942–1995), American anthropologist, mother of Barack Obama
 Stanley Ellis (cricketer) (1896–1987), English cricketer
 Stanley Ellis (linguist) (1926–2009), English linguistics scholar and broadcaster
 Stanley Fields (actor) (1883–1941), American actor
 Stanley Fields (biologist) (born 1955), American biologist 
 Stanley Fischer (born 1943), Israeli American economist
 Stanley Fisher (1867–1949), 24th Chief Justice of Ceylon
 Stanley H. Ford (1877–1961), United States Army General
 Stanley Jerome Gaetz (1914–1964), member of the North Dakota Senate
 Stanley Goble (1891–1948), Royal Australian Air Force commander
 Stanley G. Grizzle (1918–2016), Canadian citizenship judge and labour union activist
 Stanley Heaps (1880–1962), English architect responsible for the design of a number of stations on the London Underground system 
 Stanley Ho (1921–2020), Hong Kong-Macau businessman
 Stanley Holloway (1890–1982), English actor, comedian, singer and monologist
 Stanley Johnson (basketball) (born 1996), American basketball player
 Stanley Johnson (London politician) (1869–1937), English solicitor and Conservative Party politician, MP 1918–1924
 Stanley Johnson (writer) (born 1940), British author and politician, writer on environmental and population issues, MEP 1979–1984 
 Stanley Jones (cyclist) (1888–1962), British Olympic cyclist
 Stanley Kalpage (died 2000), Permanent Representative of Sri Lanka to the United Nations from 1991 to 1994
 Stanley A. Klein, American neuroscientist
 Stanley H. Klein (1908–1992), American architect
 Stanley Kramer (1913–2001), American film director and producer
 Stanley Krippner (born 1932), American psychologist, parapsychologist, and Professor of Psychology at Saybrook University
 Stanley Kubrick (1928–1999), American film director, producer, and screenwriter
 Stanley Kurtz, American conservative commentator
 Stan Laurel (1890–1965), born Arthur Stanley Jefferson, English comic actor, writer and film director
 Stanley Lechtzin (born 1936), American artist, jeweler, metalsmith, and educator
 Stan Lee (1922–2018), American comic book writer, editor, and publisher
 Stanley Lewis (sculptor) (1930–2006), Canadian sculptor
 Stanley Cornwell Lewis (1905–2009), British portrait painter and illustrator
 Stan Love (basketball) (born 1949), American basketball player
 Stanley G. Love (born 1965), American scientist and astronaut
 Sir Stanley Matthews (1915–2000), British footballer
 Stanley Mazor (born 1941), American electrical engineer and inventor
 Stanley A. McChrystal (born 1954), former Commander, International Security Assistance Force and U.S. Forces Afghanistan (USFOR-A)
 Stanley Middleton (1919–2009), British novelist
 Stanley Morgan Jr. (born 1996), American football player
 Stanley Myers (1930–1993), English composer and conductor
 Stanley Nelson Jr. (born 1951), American documentary filmmaker
 Stanley Nibbs (1914–1985), teacher and preacher from the British Virgin Islands
 Stanley Ocitti (born 1980), Ugandan basketball player
 Stan Owen (born 1932), Welsh rugby union and rugby league footballer 
 Stanley G. Payne (born 1934), American historian and Hispanist
 Stanley Peiris (1941–2002), Sri Lankan Sinhala instrumental musician and composer
 Stanley Plotkin (born 1932), American physician, vaccinologist, and immunologist
 Stanley B. Prusiner (born 1942), American neurologist and biochemist
 Stanley Robinson (disambiguation), several people
 Stanley Rogers Resor (1917–2012), American lawyer and military officer; 9th United States Secretary of the Army
 Stanley Jedidiah Samartha (1920–2001), Indian theologian 
 Stanley Savige (1890–1954), Australian soldier and businessman
 Stanley Schmidt (born 1944), American science fiction author and editor
 Stanley Senanayake (1918–1989), Inspector-General of Sri Lanka Police from 1970 to 1978
 Stanley Shakespeare (1963–2005), American football player
 Stanley Shanfield, American inventor
 Stanley Sheff, American film director and writer
 Stanley Gerald Umphrey Shier, 18th Canadian Surgeon General
 Stanley Tillekeratne, former Speaker of the Parliament of Sri Lanka
 Stanley Tretick (1921–1999), American photojournalist
 Stanley Tucci, American actor, writer, producer and film director
 Stanley Turrentine (1934–2000), American jazz saxophonist
 Stanley Unwin (comedian) (1911–2002), South African-born comedic writer and performer
 Stanley Unwin (publisher) (1884–1968), British publisher, founder of George Allen and Unwin
 Stanley Wagner (disambiguation), several people
 Stanley J. Wawrzyniak (1927–1995), American Marine officer, recipient of two Navy Crosses during Korean War
 Stanley G. Weinbaum (1902–1935), American science fiction writer
 Stanley Whittaker (born 1994), American basketball player
 Stanley Wojcicki (born 1937), Polish American emeritus professor and former chair of the physics department at Stanford University
 Stanley Wolpert (1927–2019), American historian and Indologist
 Stanley Yau (born 1990), Hong Kong singer, dancer and actor
 Stanley de Zoysa, Sri Lankan businessman and politician

People with the family name
Aileen Stanley (1897–1982), American popular singer
Allan Stanley (born 1926), Canadian professional ice hockey player
Alessandra Stanley, American journalist
Antwaun Stanley, American singer, songwriter
Arthur Penrhyn Stanley (1815–1881), English churchman, dean of Westminster
Barney Stanley (1893–1971), Canadian professional ice hockey player
Benson Stanley (born 1984), Australian-born, New Zealand Rugby Union player
Bob Stanley (baseball) (born 1954), American baseball player
Bob Stanley (musician) (born 1964), English musician
Brian Stanley (disambiguation), multiple people
Cassius Stanley (born 1999), American basketball player
Chad Stanley (born 1976), American football player
Charles Stanley (disambiguation), multiple people
Chase Stanley (born 1989), Australian-New Zealand Rugby League player
Christopher Stanley (born 1965), American actor
Clinton Warrington Stanley (1830–1884), Justice of the New Hampshire Supreme Court
David S. Stanley (1828–1902), Union general in the American Civil War and Medal of Honor recipient
Dimitrious Stanley (1974–2023), American football player
Edward Stanley (disambiguation), multiple people
Emily Stanley, American limnologist
Fiona Stanley (born 1946), Australian epidemiologist
Florence Stanley (1924–2003), American actress
Francis Edgar Stanley (1849–1918), American businessman, co-inventor of the Stanley Steamer
Frank C. Stanley, late 19th-early 20th-century American popular singer; stage name for William S. Grinsted
Freelan O. Stanley (1849–1940), co-inventor of the Stanley Steamer and founder of the Stanley Hotel
Frederick Trent Stanley (1802–1883), American industrialist, founder of Stanley Works
George F.G. Stanley (1907–2002), Canadian historian and designer of the Canadian flag
Ginger Stanley (born 1931), American model, actress and stunt woman
Helen Camille Stanley (born 1930), American composer and violist
Henrietta Stanley, Baroness Stanley of Alderley (1807–1895), British campaigner for women's education
Henrietta Stanley Dull (1863–1964), American food writer
Henry Stanley, American businessman and founder of Stanley Rule and Level Company, cousin of Frederick Trent Stanley
Henry Stanley (cricketer) (1873–1900), English cricketer
Henry Bruce 'Harry' Stanley (1953–1999), Scottish painter and decorator. The Death of Harry Stanley when he was mistakenly shot by police led to a protracted legal dispute.
Henry Morton Stanley (1841–1904), Welsh-American journalist and explorer, searched for Dr. Livingstone
Ian Stanley (born 1957), British musician
James Stanley (disambiguation), several people
Jayson Stanley (born 1997), American football player
Joe Stanley (born 1957), New Zealand Rugby Union player
John Stanley (disambiguation), several people
Kim Stanley (1925–2001), American actress
Leo Stanley (1886–1976), American surgeon
Matt Stanley (born 1989), New Zealand comedian
Mervin C. Stanley (1857–1907), New York politician
Michael Stanley (born 1948), American rock singer
Michael Stanley (rugby union) (born 1989), Samoan Rugby Union player
Mickey Stanley (born 1942), American baseball player
Mike Stanley (born 1963), American baseball player
Mike Stanley (rower) (born 1957), New Zealand Olympic rower and sports administrator
Millicent Preston-Stanley (1883–1955), Australian feminist and politician
Muriel Stanley (1918–1979), Indigenous Australian Anglican missionary, nurse and social worker
Nate Stanley (born 1997), American football player
Oliver Stanley (1896–1950), British politician
Owen Stanley (1811–1850), British naval captain
Owsley Stanley (born 1935), American "underground" chemist, mass-produced LSD
Paco Stanley (1942–1999), Mexican television entertainer, assassinated
Paul Stanley (born 1952), American rock guitarist and vocalist
Ralph Stanley (born 1927), American bluegrass musician, one of the Stanley Brothers
Richard Stanley (film director) (born 1966), South African-born film director
Richard Stanley (politician) (1920–1983), British Conservative Party Member of Parliament 1950–1966
Richard P. Stanley (born 1944), American mathematician at MIT
Robbie Stanley (born 1967), American auto racing driver
Ronja Stanley (born 1991), Finnish singer, known as Ronya
Ronnie Stanley (born 1994), American football player
Sachini Ayendra Stanley, Sri Lankan Burgher cinema actress and model
Sam Stanley (rugby player) (born 1991) English Rugby Union Player
Sidney Stanley (died 1969), Polish-British businessman
Sidney Stanley (cricketer) (born 1933), South African cricketer
Steven J. C. Stanley (born 1958), Jamaican audio engineer and producer
Steven M. Stanley (born 1941), American palaeontologist
The Stanley Brothers, Carter and Ralph, American bluegrass musicians
Thomas Stanley (author) (1625–1678), English author and translator
Thomas Bahnson Stanley (1890–1970), American politician, governor of Virginia 1954–1958
Venetia Stanley (1600–1633), English noblewoman
Venetia Stanley (1887–1948), English socialite, intimate friend of H. H. Asquith
Wendell Meredith Stanley (1904–1971), American biochemist, virologist, and Nobel prize laureate
William Stanley (Battle of Bosworth) (c. 1435–1495), English soldier, fought at the Battle of Bosworth Field
William Stanley (Elizabethan) (1548–1630), English military commander, under Queen Elizabeth I
William Stanley (inventor), British inventor and businessman
William Stanley, Jr. (1858–1916), American physicist
Winifred C. Stanley (1909–1996), U.S. Representative from New York
Woodrow Stanley (1950–2022), American politician

English nobility and gentry

any of the Stanley Baronets
any who held the title Baron Stanley
any who held the title Baron Stanley of Alderley
Albert Stanley, 1st Baron Ashfield (1874–1948), president of the Board of Trade, chairman of London Passenger Transport Board
Anne Stanley, Countess of Ancram (1600–1656/7), wife of the 1st Earl of Ancram
Edward Stanley, Lord Stanley, name used for several men: see Edward Stanley (disambiguation)
Edward John Stanley, 6th Baron Sheffield and Stanley of Alderley (1907–1971)
Henrietta Stanley, 4th Baroness Strange (1687–1718), English peeress
Henry Stanley, 4th Earl of Derby (1531–1593)
James Stanley, 7th Earl of Derby (1607–1651)
Thomas Stanley, 1st Earl of Derby (1435–1504)
William Stanley, 6th Earl of Derby (1584–1642)

Fictional characters
 Stanley (Cars), the deceased founder of the town Radiator Springs in the Cars franchise
 Stanley, an anthropomorphic white tank engine on TV series Thomas and Friends
 Stanley, a character in the film A Troll in Central Park (1994)
 Sappy Stanley, a character in the TV series Tiny Toon Adventures
 Stanley and His Monster, characters from DC Comics
 Stanley the Tool, formerly Plaid, a character in the webcomic Erfworld
 Stanley Bernstein, a character in American TV miniseries V (1983 miniseries)
 Stanley Griff, the main character of the Playhouse Disney animated series Stanley
 Stanley Hudson, a character on the TV show The Office
 Stanley Ipkiss, the main character in the comic and the film The Mask
 Stanley "Grandpa" Kanisky, a character on the American television sitcom Gimme a Break
 Stanley Kowalski, a character in A Streetcar Named Desire
 Stanley Lambchop, a main character in Jeff Brown's Flat Stanley book series
 Stan Marsh, a character on the TV show South Park
 Stanley Pines, AKA Grunkle Stan, character on the animated TV series Gravity Falls
 Stanley Roper, a character on the American sitcom Three's Company
 Stan Smith (American Dad!), the lead character from the American Dad! animated sitcom
 Stanley Snyder, a character from the manga series Dr. Stone
 Stanley Sorenson, a main character in Brandon Mull's Fablehaven book series
 Stanley Tweedle, a character on the science fiction TV series Lexx
 Stanley Yelnats IV, a character from the novel and film Holes
 Stanley Zbornak, a character in the American TV series The Golden Girls
 Stanley, the protagonist in the 2011 video game The Stanley Parable, its 2013 remake, and its 2022 Ultra Deluxe release
 Stanley the Bugman, the protagonist in the 1983 Nintendo video game Donkey Kong 3 and the 1999 game Super Smash Bros
 Beth Stanley, a character in the 1998 American science-fiction disaster movie Deep Impact

See also
Stanley (disambiguation)
Stanislav (given name)

English-language surnames
English-language masculine given names
English masculine given names